Rashid al-Din or Rashid ad-Din, under various transliterations including Rashîduddîn, may refer to:

Rashid-al-Din Hamadani (1247–1318), Persian historian
Rashid ad-Din Sinan, 12th century Syrian religious figure and leader of resistance to the Crusades
Rashid al-Din Vatvat, 12th century Persian royal panegyrist and epistolographer
Amin al-Din Rashid al-Din Vatvat, 13th century Persian physician

Arabic masculine given names